Kazi Anowar Hossain (14 January 1941 – 8 February 2007) was a Bangladeshi painter who was known for his classical portrayal of rural Bengal. He was awarded Ekushey Padak in 2016 posthumously by the Government of Bangladesh.

Early life
Although born in Gopalganj district, he grew up in Madaripur, in the service of his father. While studying in secondary school, he started as a painter. After completing his graduation in 1964 from the Faculty of Fine Arts, University of Dhaka, he concentrated entirely on painting.

Career
At the beginning of his career, Hossain painted the pictures of the rural village of Bengal And later he liked to paint miniature pictures. His drawings were displayed differently and jointly with more than 22 out of country and country. During the 1988 flood, he sold photographs and donated the money. The President Sheikh Mujibur Rahman gifted a portrait of a boat drawn by Hossain to Indian Prime Minister Indira Gandhi.

Hossain created more than 2000 paintings.

References

1941 births
2007 deaths
People from Gopalganj District, Bangladesh
University of Dhaka Faculty of Fine Arts alumni
Bangladeshi painters
Recipients of the Ekushey Padak